Abul Hasan Jashori (1918 – 8 July 1993) was a Bangladeshi Islamic scholar, politician, author, teacher and freedom fighter. He was the founding principal and Shaykh al-Hadith of the Jamia Ezazia Darul Uloom Jessore institution.

Early life and education
Abul Hasan was born in 1918, to a Bengali Muslim family in the village of Bhabanipur in Harinakunda, Jhenaidah, then located under the Jessore District of the Bengal Province. His father's name was Janab Ali Bishwas. His early education began at the local village primary school, before joining the Magura High School where he completed his matriculation and enrolled at the Magura College. In 1937, he moved to Delhi to obtain further Islamic studies at the Fatehpur Madrasah and Madrasah-e-Rahmatiyyah. After spending six years in Delhi, he was then admitted to Darul Uloom Deoband where he studied under the likes of Hussain Ahmed Madani, Ibrahim Bailyavi, Izaz Ali Amrohi and Shafi Usmani and specialised in Hadith studies. He was also a murid of Madani, and then Azizul Haq after the partition.

Career

He returned to Bengal after completing his studies, and was appointed in 1948 as the Shaykh al-Hadith (Professor of Hadith studies) of the Jamia Islamia Darul Uloom Khademul Islam madrasa of Shamsul Haque Faridpuri in Gawhardanga. In 1959, philanthropist Chowdhury Altaf Husayn donated some land for the establishment of a madrasa in Jessore with the assistance of Mawla Faruq, son of Habibullah Qurayshi. Abul Hasan was appointed as this madrasa's first principal and Shaykh al-Hadith, and was committed to this role until his death. The madrasa was named Jamia Ezazia Darul Uloom Jessore after his teacher Izaz Ali Amrohi. Taking Jessore as his residence, it was from then on that Abul Hasan became known as Abul Hasan Jashori.

In politics, Jashori was initially aligned with the All-India Muslim League. However, he joined the Jamiat Ulema-e-Islam when it was founded in 1945. In 1967, he was appointed as the vice-president of the party and remained so until his death. During the Bangladesh Liberation War, he gave public speeches to motivate people to support the cause. Jashori also provided refuge to Bengali freedom fighters and Hindu civilians at his madrasa in Jessore.

1n 1975, Jashori founded the Ehsania Madrasah in Narail. He also founded the Shamsul Uloom Madrasah in Lakshmipasha in 1982, and the Zakariyya Madrasah in Senhati, Khulna in 1980.

Works
Jashori has written several works pertaining to Islam. Some of these include:

Death and legacy
Jashori died after Fajr prayers on 8 July 1993 in Jessore. He was buried in the graveyard of the Darul Uloom Jessore madrasa.

Notes

References

Deobandis
1918 births
1993 deaths
People from Jhenaidah District
Darul Uloom Deoband alumni
20th-century Muslim scholars of Islam
20th-century Muslim theologians
People of the Bangladesh Liberation War
Bangladeshi Sunni Muslim scholars of Islam
Bengali Muslim scholars of Islam
Jamiat Ulema-e-Islam Bangladesh politicians
20th-century Bengalis
Disciples of Hussain Ahmad Madani
Jamiat Ulema-e-Islam politicians